is a Japanese actress.

Shibamoto is represented with Ken-On. Her father is Toshio Shiba, her mother is Kyoko Maya, and her aunt is Azusa Mano, who are all also actors.

Filmography

TV dramas

Films

Stage

Magazines

Advertisements

References

External links
 
 – Ken-On 
 – Ameba Blog 

Japanese actresses
Ken-On artists
People from Tokyo
Keio University alumni
1983 births
Living people